Vachellia permixta, the hairy acacia, is a species of plant in the family Fabaceae. It is found in Botswana, the Northern Provinces of South Africa, and Zimbabwe.

References

permixta
Flora of Botswana
Flora of the Northern Provinces
Flora of Zimbabwe
Least concern plants
Taxonomy articles created by Polbot